Alternative Airplay is a record chart published by the music industry magazine Billboard that ranks the most-played songs on American modern rock radio stations. It was introduced by Billboard in September 1988. During the 2010s, the chart was named Alternative Songs and based on electronically monitored airplay data compiled by Nielsen Broadcast Data Systems from a panel of national rock radio stations, with songs being ranked by their total number of spins per week.

115 songs topped the Alternative Songs chart during the 2010s. The first number one of the 2010s was "Uprising" by Muse, while the last was "Orphans" by Coldplay. From October 2012 to February 2013, Muse's song "Madness" topped the chart for 19 non-consecutive weeks, breaking the record for the most weeks spent at number one by a song in the chart's history. In 2017, "Feel It Still" by Portugal. The Man broke this record by topping the chart for 20 weeks. The American band Cage the Elephant attained nine Alternative Songs number-one hits during the 2010s, the most by any artist within the decade.

Number-one songs
Key
 – Billboard year-end number-one song
↑ – Return of a song to number one

References

External links
 Alternative Airplay at Billboard

2010s
United States alternative songs